The Qiṣaṣ al-Anbiyāʾ or Stories of the Prophets is any of various collections of stories adapted from the Quran and other Islamic literature, closely related to exegesis of the Qur'an. Similar to haggadic texts, the qusas are often didactical. In early period of Islam, they were inseparable from tafsir, but developed into a distinct genre later. One of the best-known is a work composed by the Persian author Abū Ishāq Ibrāhīm bin Mansūr bin Khalaf of Neyshābūr (a city located in Khorasan, Northeast Iran) the 12th century AD (AH 5th century); another was composed by Muhammad al-Kisai in the 8th century AD (AH 2nd century); others include the Ara'is al-Majalis by al-Tha'labi (d. 1035, AH 427) and the Qasas al-Anbiya by Ibn Kathir (d. 1372, AH 774). The narrations within the Qisas Al-Anbiya, are not about historical accuracy, but rather about wisdom and moral teachings.

Overview

Because the lives of biblical figures—the Muslim prophets or  anbiya—were covered only briefly in the Qur'an, scholars, poets, historians, and storytellers felt free to elaborate, clothing the bare bones with flesh and blood. Authors of these texts drew on many traditions available to medieval Islamic civilization such as those of Asia, Africa, China, and Europe.  Many of these scholars were also authors of commentaries on the Qur'an; unlike Qur'an commentaries, however, which follow the order and structure of the Qur'an itself, the Qiṣaṣ told its stories of the prophets in chronological order  – which makes them similar to the Jewish and Christian versions of the Bible.

The Qiṣaṣ thus usually begins with the creation of the world and its various creatures including angels, and culminating in Adam.   Following the stories of the Prophet Adam and his family come the tales of Idris, Nuh, Shem, Hud, Salih, Ibrahim, Ismail and his mother Hajar, Lut, Ishaq, Yaqub and Esau, Yousuf, Shuaib, Musa and his brother Aaron, Khidr, Joshua, Josephus, Eleazar, Elijah, Samuel, Saul, Dawud, Sulaiman, Yunus, Dhul-Kifl and Dhul-Qarnayn all the way up to and including Yahya and Isa son of Maryam. Sometimes the author incorporated related local folklore or oral traditions, and many of the Qiṣaṣ al-'Anbiyā''s tales echo medieval Christian and Jewish stories.

In the Umayyad Caliphate paid story tellers to preach about religion to the people. Along with preachers during the Friday prayers, they were the first paid functionaries of Islamic religion. In the following epochs,  they have not been paid anymore, became associated with folkloric preachers and have been disregarded by institutional scholars (ulama).

During the mid-16th century, several gorgeously illuminated versions of the Qiṣaṣ were created by unnamed Ottoman Empire painters. According to Milstein et al., "iconographical study [of the texts] reveals ideological programs and cliché typical of the Ottoman polemical discourse with its Shi‘ite rival in Iran, and its Christian neighbors in the West."

See also

 Biblical and Quranic narratives
 Cave of Treasures
 History of the Prophets and Kings
 History of the Quran
 Islamic mythology
 List of legends in the Quran
 List of biographies of Muhammad
 Midrash Rabbah
 Prophets and messengers in Islam

References

Sources
 Wheeler, Brannon.  Stories of the Prophets—illuminated manuscript pages
 Milstein, Rachel, Karin Ruhrdanz, and Barbara Schmitz (1999).  ''Stories of the Prophets: Illustrated Manuscripts of Qisas al-Anbiya'' (Islamic Art & Architecture Series, No. 8). Mazda Publishers, Inc.
 Qasas-ul-Anbiya—EasyIslam
 KAZI Publications Inc.: Tales of the Prophets (Qisas al-anbiya)
 Stories of the Prophets—World Digital Library

External links
 Stories of the Prophets as Told by People of the Desert
STORIES OF PROPHETS - by Ibn Kathir: (Urdu / Arabic/ English / Bangla / Pashto) - with similar Books 

Islamic mythology
Islamic literature
Medieval Arabic literature
Middle Eastern mythology